George Platt may refer to:

 George Crawford Platt (1842–1912), Medal of Honor recipient in the American Civil War
 George Platt (politician) (died 1816), blacksmith and political figure in Lower Canada
 George Platt (cricketer) (1881–1955), English cricketer
 George Foster Platt (1866–?), stage actor and director